An Oropesa is a streamlined towed body used in the process of minesweeping. The role of the Oropesa is to keep the towed sweep at a determined depth and position from the sweeping ship. Oropesa are standard devices used on Avenger-class mine countermeasures ships.

The device derives its name from the ship on which it was developed, HMS Oropesa, a converted British Steam trawler.

See also
 Paravane
 Naval mine

References

External links
Vrienden van de Koninklijke Marine. , Mechanical minesweeping

Minesweepers